8 Aquarii (abbreviated 8 Aqr) is a blue-white sub-giant of the spectral class A4IV in the constellation Aquarius. 8 Aquarii is the Flamsteed designation.  It is approximately 290 light-years away from Earth, based on parallax. It is approximately 1.7 solar masses and about 3 times hotter than the Sun and thus allows lines of ionized metals with an abundance of metals.

References

External links
 

Aquarius (constellation)
Aquarii, 008
A-type subgiants
103640
199828
Durchmusterung objects